The Khujand clan, also known as the Leninabad clan, is the name given to  political alliance based in Khujand, Tajikistan. The clan largely controlled the Government of Tajikistan from  World War II until the Tajik Civil War.

Rahmon Nabiyev, a member of the Khujand clan, became the President of Tajikistan in November 1991. He served until August 1992 when he was forced to resign at gunpoint.

References 

Politics of Tajikistan
Political organizations based in Tajikistan